HD 83095 is a single star in the southern constellation of Carina. It has the Bayer designation H Carinae; HD 83095 is the identifier from the Henry Draper Catalogue. This object has an orange hue and is dimly visible to the naked eye with an apparent visual magnitude of 5.46. The star is located at a distance of approximately 710 light years from the Sun based on parallax, and is drifting further away with a radial velocity of +14 km/s. It has an absolute magnitude of −1.45.

This is an aging K-type giant star with a stellar classification of K4III, having exhausted the supply of hydrogen at its core then cooled and expanded off the main sequence. At present it has about 60 times the radius of the Sun and is radiating 769 times the Sun's luminosity from its swollen photosphere at an effective temperature of 3,940 K.

References

K-type giants
Carina (constellation)
Carinae, H
Durchmusterung objects
083095
046741
3821